Tisdel is a surname. Notable people with the surname include:

 Jeff Tisdel (born 1956), American football coach
 Lana Tisdel (born 1975), American criminal
 Mark Tisdel (born 1955), American politician

See also
 Tisdale (disambiguation)

Americanized surnames